The Statute of Enrolments was a 1536 Act of the Parliament of England that regulated the sale and transfer of landsmen. The Statute is commonly considered an addition to the Statute of Uses, which was passed within the same Parliament, probably due to an omission in the Statute of Uses. It is thought to have been intended to prevent secret conveyancing, although modern academics instead assert that it was so Henry VIII could keep an accurate record of who his freeholders were. The Statute, which only provided for estates "of inheritance and freehold", was easily evaded through the sale of an estate for a limited time period, as leasehold, something given validity at the common law level in 1621 by Lutwich v Mitton.

Statute
The Statute was intended as an addition to the Statute of Uses, and was passed in the same session of Parliament; Edward Coke, for example, referred to it as "but a Proviso" to the Statute of Uses. The Statute was drafted quickly, by the Clerk of the House of Commons rather than a legislator, and is interesting in that unlike most government bills it completely lacks a preamble. It is thought by Charles Isaac Elton that it was drafted "as some sort of emergency legislation", which Kaye backs up, saying that it was most likely due to some omission in the Statute of Uses. The Statute provided that after 31 July 1536, no land was to be transferred based on a sale unless that sale had been certified by either the courts in Westminster or the local Justices of the Peace, unless it was in those cities or boroughs where this was already required.

The Statute was evaded through simply selling the land for a period of years, rather than freehold, something given validity at the common law by Lutwich v Mitton in 1621. This was valid because the statute only applied to estates "of inheritance and freehold", not of leasehold. The common impression is that the Statute was intended to prevent secret conveyancing; Oxland instead interprets it as being a way for Henry VIII to keep an accurate record of who his freeholders were at any one time.

References

Bibliography

Real property law
Acts of the Parliament of England (1485–1603)
Legal history of England
1536 in law
1536 in England